Ernie Cunliffe (born September 2, 1937) is an American middle-distance runner. He competed in the men's 800 metres at the 1960 Summer Olympics.

References

External links
 

1937 births
Living people
Athletes (track and field) at the 1960 Summer Olympics
American male middle-distance runners
Stanford Cardinal men's track and field athletes
Olympic track and field athletes of the United States
Track and field athletes from Long Beach, California
Pan American Games medalists in athletics (track and field)
Pan American Games bronze medalists for the United States
Athletes (track and field) at the 1959 Pan American Games
Athletes (track and field) at the 1963 Pan American Games
Medalists at the 1963 Pan American Games
20th-century American people